Autosticha suwonensis is a moth in the family Autostichidae. It was described by Kyu-Tek Park and Chun-Sheng Wu in 2003. It is found in Korea.

The wingspan is about 15 mm. The forewings are brownish orange with a blackish-brown pattern. The first discal stigma is found at the middle of the cell, with the plical below the first and second at the end of the cell. There is a series of yellowish brown dots along the posterior half of the costal and inner margins and termen. The hindwings are pale greyish orange.

Etymology
The species name is derived from the type location.

References

Moths described in 2003
Autosticha
Moths of Asia